5 Gold Rings is a British game show that aired on ITV from 5 March 2017 to 6 December 2020. It was hosted by Phillip Schofield.

It was based on the Dutch game show 5 Golden Rings, with the first series being filmed on the same set in the Netherlands and the second and third series at BBC Elstree Centre in London. An app had also been released, so viewers can play along with the show.

Gameplay

Overview
Two teams of two contestants each compete through five rounds to build up separate prize banks. At the start of each round, the teams choose one member to play. A picture is displayed on a large circular LED screen set into the studio floor, and the contestant has 30 seconds to place a gold ring on a spot named by the host. Successfully doing so (defined as having any portion of the correct spot within the ring) adds money to the team's bank. In each successive round, the ring size decreases and the money at stake increases. The non-participating teammate may offer advice as desired.

Examples of questions include:

 Given an unlabelled map of Scotland, mark the location of Loch Ness.
 Given an unlabelled timeline from 1901 to 2000, mark the year in which Muhammad Ali won a gold medal in boxing at the Summer Olympics.
 Given a photograph of the Golden Gate Bridge and an incomplete reflection of it in the water below, mark the spot where the reflection of a specified point should appear.

Each team has two forms of assistance ("lifelines") that may be used once per game. At the start of a round, the teammate not participating in a question may press a button to signal that they want to use a lifeline. The options are:

 Flip the Floor: A second question is presented, and the team then decides whether to play it or keep the original one.
 Team of Five: Each team brings a group of five supporters to the studio. The team's group members use individual tablet computers to indicate their guesses at the correct answer; these guesses are displayed on the floor screen.

Series 1
Each completed question increases the team's bank by one level (£1,000, £2,500, £5,000, £10,000, £25,000). One team plays all five rounds before the other takes a turn. The maximum potential bank is £25,000, obtained by completing all five rounds.

Series 2 to Series 4
Each team has a turn in every round, and successful completions add a set amount to the bank that increases from one round to the next (£1,000, £2,500, £5,000, £7,500, £10,000). In addition, if one team misses a question, the opponents can steal the money at stake by correctly re-positioning the ring within 15 seconds.

The maximum potential bank is £52,000, obtainable if one team completes all five rounds and steals all available money from the opponents.

Final
The team with the higher bank has control of a question; if the teams are tied, a coin toss decides control. The final question is always a memory question except in the second and sixth episodes of the first series which were prediction questions. After hearing the question, the team may either play it or pass it to the opponents. Each team is given one ring, with the larger one going to the leaders; in case of a tie, both teams receive identical rings.

One member of the team playing the question has 30 seconds to place the ring as instructed. If they succeed, the team win their entire bank and the opponents win nothing. If they fail, the opponents win their own bank instead.

Transmissions

International versions
Legend:  Currently airing    No longer airing    Upcoming    Pilot

Merchandise 
A board game version of the series was released in 2018.

References

External links

2017 British television series debuts
2020 British television series endings
2010s British game shows
2020s British game shows
English-language television shows
ITV game shows
Television series by ITV Studios